Marabá Paulista is a municipality in the state of São Paulo in Brazil. The population is 5,948 (2020 est.) in an area of 920 km². The elevation is 401 m.

The municipality contains part of the  Great Pontal Reserve, created in 1942.
It also contains 23% of the  Mico Leão Preto Ecological Station, established in 2002.

References

Municipalities in São Paulo (state)